Sundman may refer to:

 Danne Sundman (born 1973), politician from the Åland Islands
 Jimmy Sundman (born 1989), Finnish footballer
 Karl F. Sundman (1873–1949), Finnish mathematician
 Sundman (crater), a lunar impact crater
 Mikael Sundman (born 1947), Finnish architect
 Per Olof Sundman (1922–1992), Swedish writer and politician